Nipos or Nippos is a village in Chania regional unit and is 33 km away from the city of Chania. It is part of the municipality of Apokoronas.

References

External links 
 Site Name: FRE - TZITZIFES - NIPOS Hellenic Ministry for the Environment, Public Planning & Public works.

Populated places in Chania (regional unit)